The 1933–34 Connecticut Aggies men's basketball team represented Connecticut State College, now the University of Connecticut, in the 1933–34 collegiate men's basketball season. The Aggies completed the season with a 5–10 overall record. The Aggies were members of the New England Conference, where they ended the season with a 1–2 record. The Aggies played their home games at Hawley Armory in Storrs, Connecticut, and were led by third-year head coach John J. Heldman, Jr. The season was marred by a racist incident targeting sophomore player Harrison Fitch during an away game against the US Coast Guard Academy in New London on January 27, 1934.

Schedule 

|-
!colspan=12 style=""| Regular Season

Schedule Source:

References 

UConn Huskies men's basketball seasons
Connecticut
1933 in sports in Connecticut
1934 in sports in Connecticut